Holzemer is a surname. Notable people with the surname include:

James Holzemer (born 1935), American politician
Mark Holzemer (born 1969), American baseball player

See also
Holzamer